Lipót is a village in Győr-Moson-Sopron county, Hungary.

Things to See and Do 

 Thermal Bath 
 Lipóti Bakery

Sport
Lipót SE, association football club

External links 
 Street map 

Populated places in Győr-Moson-Sopron County